Krivi Vrh is a small settlement in the Municipality of Sveta Ana in the Slovene Hills in northeastern Slovenia.

References

External links
Krivi Vrh on Geopedia

Populated places in the Municipality of Sveta Ana